Madan-e Gadartul (also Romanized as Maʿdan-e Gadārtūl and Maʿdan-e Gadārṭūl) is a village in Soghan Rural District, Soghan District, Arzuiyeh County, Kerman Province, Iran. At the 2006 census, its population was 39, in 9 families.

References 

Populated places in Arzuiyeh County